Pongch'ŏn County (Pongch'ŏn-gun) is located in South Hwanghae Province, North Korea. Formerly known as P'yŏngch'ŏn County (平川郡), this county was split from P'yŏngsan County in 1952. In 1990, it was given its current name.

Administrative divisions
Pongch'ŏn county is divided into 1 ŭp (town) and 22 ri (villages):

References

Counties of South Hwanghae